Jorge Rodríguez may refer to:

Arts and entertainment
 Jorge Rodriguez-Gerada (born 1966), Cuban-American artist
 Jorge Rodríguez (director), Venezuelan filmmaker
 Jorge Rodriguez (radio host), Cuban-American radio talk show host, founder of SoFloRadio.com
 Jorge Luis Rodriguez, Puerto Rican artist

Sports

Association football
 Jorge Rodríguez (footballer, born 1968), Mexican footballer
 Jorge Rodríguez (footballer, born 1971), Salvadoran footballer
 Jorge Rodríguez (footballer, born 1977), Uruguayan footballer
 Jorge Rodríguez (footballer, born 1980), Spanish footballer
 Jorge Rodríguez (footballer, born 1985), Uruguayan footballer
 Jorge Rodríguez (footballer, born 1990), Puerto Rican soccer player
 Jorge Rodríguez (footballer, born 1995), Argentine footballer
 Jorge Rodríguez Navarro, Mexican footballer

Other sports
 Jorge Rodríguez (alpine skier) (born 1945), Spanish Olympic skier
 Jorge Rodríguez (gymnast) (born 1948), Cuban Olympic gymnast

Others
 Jorge Rodríguez (Argentine politician) (born 1944), former cabinet chief of Argentina
 Jorge Rodriguez-Chomat (1945-2017), American state legislator and judge
 Jorge Rodriguez Beruff (born 1947), Puerto Rican historian
 José Gonzalo Rodríguez Gacha (1947-1989), Colombian drug lord
 Jorge Rodríguez-Novelo (born 1955), American bishop
 Jorge Enrique Rodríguez (born 1963), Colombian guerrilla leader 
 Jorge Rodríguez (Venezuelan politician) (born 1965), former vice president of Venezuela